This is a list of fossiliferous stratigraphic units in Guinea.



See also 
 Lists of fossiliferous stratigraphic units in Africa
 List of fossiliferous stratigraphic units in Ivory Coast
 List of fossiliferous stratigraphic units in Mali
 List of fossiliferous stratigraphic units in Senegal
 Geology of Guinea

References

Further reading 
 P. R. Racheboeuf and M. Villeneuve. 1992. Une faune Malvino-Cafre de Brachiopodes Siluriens du Bassin Bove (Guinee, Ouest de l'Afrique). Geologica et Palaeontologica 26:1-11
 M. Villeneuve, M. C. Diallo, F. Keleba, S. Kourouma, F. Paris and P. R. Racheboeuf. 1989. Donnees paleontologiques nouvelles sur le Paleozoique du Bassin Bove (Guinee, Afrique de l'Ouest): consequences stratigraphiques. Comptes Rendus de l'Academie des Sciences, Serie II 309:1583-1590

Guinea
Paleontology in Guinea
Guinea
Fossiliferous stratigraphic units
Fossil